Sagittala is a genus of moths of the family Notodontidae. It consists of only one species, Sagittala peba, which is found in Panama and Costa Rica.

References

Notodontidae
Monotypic moth genera
Moths of Central America